The Edmonton Sun is a daily newspaper and news website published in Edmonton, Alberta, Canada. It is owned by Postmedia following its 2015 acquisition of Sun Media from Quebecor.

It began publishing Sunday April 2, 1978 and shares many characteristics with Sun Media's other tabloids, including an emphasis on local news stories, its conservative editorial stance, extensive sports coverage, and a daily Sunshine Girl. Once each year, the Edmonton Sun prints a special swimsuit edition. Around Christmas time, they print a holiday lingerie edition.

Circulation 
The Edmonton Sun has seen like most Canadian daily newspapers a decline in circulation. Its total circulation dropped by  percent to 37,649 copies daily from 2009 to 2015.

As of 2023, Edmonton Sun has a daily circulation of approximately 50,000 copies, and its readership includes a diverse mix of ages and demographics. The newspaper is available for purchase at newsstands and convenience stores throughout the city, as well as through home delivery.

Daily average

See also

 Ottawa Sun
 Calgary Sun
 Toronto Sun
 Winnipeg Sun
 List of newspapers in Canada

References

Further reading

External links
 

Newspapers published in Edmonton
Postmedia Network publications
Publications established in 1978
Daily newspapers published in Alberta
Conservative media in Canada